The 1965 Western Michigan Broncos football team was an American football team that represented Western Michigan University during the 1965 NCAA University Division football season. In their second season under head coach Bill Doolittle, the Broncos compiled a 6–2–1 record and finished in third place in the Mid-American Conference (MAC).

The team's statistical leaders were Ron Seifert with 698 passing yards, Steve Terlep with 362 rushing yards, and Dave Mollard with 25 catches for 276 receiving yards. Center Jim Reid and guard Nelson Jackson were the team captains. Offensive tackle Bob Rowe received the team's most outstanding player award.

Schedule

References

Western Michigan
Western Michigan Broncos football seasons
Western Michigan Broncos football